The Double Life of Veronique is a 1991 drama film directed by Krzysztof Kieślowski and starring Irène Jacob. Written by Kieślowski and Krzysztof Piesiewicz, the film explores the themes of identity, love, and human intuition through the characters of Weronika, a Polish choir soprano, and her double, Véronique, a French music teacher. Despite not knowing each other, the two women share a mysterious and emotional bond that transcends language and geography.

The Double Life of Véronique was Kieślowski's first film to be produced partly outside his native Poland. It won the Prize of the Ecumenical Jury and the FIPRESCI Prize at the 1991 Cannes Film Festival, as well as the Best Actress Award for Jacob. Although selected as the Polish entry for the Best Foreign Language Film at the 64th Academy Awards, it was not accepted as a nominee.

Plot
In 1968, a Polish girl glimpses the winter stars, while in France, another girl witnesses the first spring leaf. Fast forward to 1990, and we meet Weronika (Irène Jacob), a young Polish woman who is singing at an outdoor concert with her choir when a rainstorm interrupts their performance. Later that night, she makes love to her boyfriend, Antek (Jerzy Gudejko), before leaving for Kraków the next day to be with her sick aunt. She tells her father that she has been feeling a sense of not being alone in the world lately. Once in Kraków, Weronika joins a local choir and successfully auditions. One day, while walking in the city, she sees a French tourist who looks identical to her and watches as her doppelganger boards a bus and takes photographs. During the concert, Weronika suffers a cardiac arrest and dies.

On the same day in France, Véronique (also played by Jacob), who looks exactly like Weronika, is overcome with grief after having sex with her boyfriend and later tells her music teacher that she's quitting the choir. At school, Véronique attends a marionette performance with her class and then leads them in a musical piece by Van den Budenmayer, the same composer who wrote the music Weronika performed before her death. That night, Véronique sees the puppeteer at a traffic light motioning to her not to light the wrong end of her cigarette. Later, she hears a choir singing Van den Budenmayer's music on a mysterious phone call. Véronique visits her father and confesses to being in love with someone she doesn't know and feeling like she's lost someone from her life.

Back home, Véronique receives a package containing a shoelace, and a stranger shines a light on her using a mirror. She discovers that the puppeteer's identity is Alexandre Fabbri (Philippe Volter), a children's book author. Véronique reads his books and then receives a new package from her father with a cassette tape containing sounds that lead her to a café in Paris where Alexandre is waiting for her. He confesses to sending the packages to see if she would come to him, but Véronique is angry and checks into a nearby hotel. Alexandre follows her and asks for her forgiveness. They confess their feelings for each other and fall asleep together.

The next morning, Véronique tells Alexandre that she feels like she is "here and somewhere else at the same time," and believes that someone has been guiding her life. She shows him the contents of her handbag, including a proof sheet of photos from her recent trip to Poland. Alexandre thinks he sees a photo of Véronique, but she assures him that it is not her. Overwhelmed, Véronique breaks down in tears, and Alexandre comforts her. It becomes clear that Weronika's fate has influenced Véronique's decision to stop singing and avoid a similar fate.

Later, Véronique visits Alexandre at his apartment and sees him working on a pair of marionettes that resemble her. Alexandre explains that he needs a backup in case the original puppet gets damaged. He demonstrates how to operate the puppet while the duplicate lies on the table. Alexandre reads her his new book about two women born on the same day in different cities who have a mysterious connection. Later that day, Véronique visits her father's house and touches an old tree trunk. Her father, who is inside the house, seems to sense her presence.

Cast

Production

Filming style
The film incorporates a strong metaphysical element, yet the supernatural aspect of the story remains unexplained. Similar to Three Colours: Blue, Preisner's musical score plays a significant role in the plot and is credited to the fictional Van den Budenmayer. The cinematography is highly stylized, utilizing color and camera filters to create an ethereal atmosphere. Sławomir Idziak, the cinematographer, had previously experimented with these techniques in an episode of Dekalog, while Kieślowski expanded on the use of color for a wider range of effects in his Three Colours trilogy. Kieślowski had previously explored the concept of different life paths for the same individual in his Polish film, Przypadek (Blind Chance). The central choice faced by Weronika/Véronique is based on a brief subplot in the ninth episode of Dekalog.

Filming locations
The film was shot at locations including Clermont-Ferrand, Kraków and Paris.

Alternative ending
In November 2006, a Criterion Collection region 1 DVD was released in the United States and Canada, which includes an alternative ending that Kieślowski changed in the edit at the request of Harvey Weinstein of Miramax for the American release. Kieślowski added four brief shots to the end of the film, which show Véronique's father emerging from the house and Véronique running across the yard to embrace him. The final image of the father and daughter embracing is shot from inside the house through a window.

Music
The film was scored by Zbigniew Preisner. However, in the film, the music is attributed to a fictitious 18th-century Dutch composer named Van den Budenmayer, who was created by Preisner and Kieślowski for use in screenplays. Music attributed to this imaginary composer also appears in two other Kieślowski films: Dekalog (1988), and Three Colours: Blue (1993). In the latter, a theme from Van den Budenmayer's musique funebres is quoted in the Song for the Unification of Europe, and the E minor soprano solo is foreshadowed in Weronika's final performance.

Puppetry
The puppet acts in The Double Life of Véronique were performed by American puppeteer and sculptor Bruce Schwartz. Unlike most puppeteers who usually hide their hands in gloves or use strings or sticks, Schwartz shows his hands while performing.

Reception

Critical response
The Double Life of Veronique received mostly positive reviews. In her review in Not Coming to a Theater Near You, Jenny Jediny wrote, "In many ways, The Double Life of Veronique is a small miracle of cinema; ... Kieslowski’s strong, if largely post-mortem reputation among the art house audience has elevated a film that makes little to no sense on paper, while its emotional tone strikes a singular—perhaps perfect—key."

In his review in The Washington Post, Hal Hinson called the film "a mesmerizing poetic work composed in an eerie minor key." Noting that the effect on the viewer is subtle but very real, Hinson concluded, "The film takes us completely into its world, and in doing so, it leaves us with the impression that our own world, once we return to it, is far richer and portentous than we had imagined." Hinson was particularly impressed with Jacob's performance:

In her review in The New York Times, Caryn James wrote, "Veronique is poetic in the truest sense, relying on images that can't be turned into prosaic statements without losing something of their essence. The film suggests mysterious connections of personality and emotion, but it was never meant to yield any neat, summary idea about the two women's lives."

In his review in the Chicago Sun-Times, Roger Ebert wrote, "The movie has a hypnotic effect. We are drawn into the character, not kept at arm's length with a plot." Ebert singled out Sławomir Idziak's innovative use of color and cinematography:

In 2009, Ebert added The Double Life of Veronique to his Great Movies list. Krzysztof Kieślowski's Dekalog and The Three Colours Trilogy are also on the list.

In his review for Empire Online, David Parkinson called it "a film of great fragility and beauty, with the delicacy of the puppet theatre." He thought the film was "divinely photographed" by Slawomir Idziak, and praised Irène Jacob's performance as "simply sublime and thoroughly merited the Best Actress prize at Cannes." Parkinson saw the film as "compelling, challenging and irresistibly beautiful" and a "metaphysical masterpiece."

At the All Movie web site, the film received a 4-star rating (out of 5) plus "High Artistic Quality" citation. At About.com, which specializes in DVD reviews, the film received 5 stars (out of 5) in their critical review. At BBC, the film received 3 stars (out of 5). Peter Bradshaw of The Guardian gave the film five stars out of five. On the aggregate reviewer website Rotten Tomatoes, the film received an 84% positive rating from critics based on 31 reviews.

Box office performance
The film was the 50th highest-grossing film of the year with a total of 592,241 admissions in France. In North America the film opened on one screen grossing $8,572 its opening weekend. In total the film grossed $1,999,955 at the North American box office playing at a total of 22 theaters in its widest release which is a respectable result for a foreign art film.

Home media
A digitally restored version of the film was released on DVD and Blu-ray by The Criterion Collection. The release includes audio commentary by Annette Insdorf, author of Double Lives, Second Chances: The Cinema of Krzysztof Kieślowski; three short documentary films by Kieślowski: Factory (1970), Hospital (1976), and Railway Station (1980); The Musicians (1958), a short film by Kieślowski's teacher Kazimierz Karabasz; Kieślowski’s Dialogue (1991), a documentary featuring a candid interview with Kieślowski and rare behind-the-scenes footage from the set of The Double Life of Véronique; 1966-1988: Kieślowski, Polish Filmmaker, a 2005 documentary tracing the filmmaker's work in Poland, from his days as a student through The Double Life of Veronique; a 2005 interview with actress Irène Jacob; and new video interviews with cinematographer Slawomir Idziak and composer Zbigniew Preisner.  It also includes a booklet featuring essays by Jonathan Romney, Slavoj Zizek, and Peter Cowie, and a selection from Kieślowski on Kieślowski.

Awards and nominations
 1991 Cannes Film Festival Prize of the Ecumenical Jury (Krzysztof Kieślowski) Won
 1991 Cannes Film Festival FIPRESCI Prize (Krzysztof Kieślowski) Won
 1991 Cannes Film Festival Award for Best Actress (Irène Jacob) Won
 1991 Cannes Film Festival nomination for the Golden Palm (Krzysztof Kieślowski)
 1991 Los Angeles Film Critics Award for Best Music (Zbigniew Preisner) Won
 1991 Warsaw International Film Festival Audience Award (Krzysztof Kieślowski) Won
 1991 French Syndicate of Cinema Critics Award for Best Foreign Film Won
 1992 César Awards Nomination for Best Actress (Irène Jacob)
 1992 César Awards nomination for Best Music Written for a Film (Zbigniew Preisner)
 1992 Golden Globe Awards nomination for Best Foreign Language Film
 1992 Guldbagge Awards nomination for Best Foreign Film
 1992 Independent Spirit Awards nomination for Best Foreign Film
 1992 National Society of Film Critics Award for Best Foreign Language Film Won

In July 2021, the film was shown in the Cannes Classics section at the 2021 Cannes Film Festival.

See also
 List of submissions to the 64th Academy Awards for Best Foreign Language Film
 List of Polish submissions for the Academy Award for Best Foreign Language Film
 Doppelgänger

Notes

References

Bibliography

External links
 
 
 
 The Double Life of Veronique: The Forced Choice of Freedom an essay by Slavoj ŽiŽek at the Criterion Collection
 The Double Life of Veronique: Through the Looking Glass an essay by Jonathan Romney at the Criterion Collection

1990s French-language films
1990s Polish-language films
1990s French films
1990s fantasy drama films
1991 films
1991 multilingual films
French multilingual films
Polish multilingual films
Norwegian multilingual films
French fantasy drama films
Films directed by Krzysztof Kieślowski
Films with screenplays by Krzysztof Piesiewicz
Films with screenplays by Krzysztof Kieślowski
Films scored by Zbigniew Preisner
Films set in Kraków
Films set in Paris
Films set in Poland
Films set in France
Films shot in France
Films shot in Paris
Films shot in Poland
Films shot in Kraków